Methylsterol monooxygenase (methylsterol hydroxylase, 4-methylsterol oxidase, 4,4-dimethyl-5alpha-cholest-7-en-3beta-ol,hydrogen-donor:oxygen oxidoreductase (hydroxylating)) is an enzyme with systematic name 4,4-dimethyl-5alpha-cholest-7-en-3beta-ol,NAD(P)H:oxygen oxidoreductase (hydroxylating). This enzyme catalyses the following chemical reaction

 4,4-dimethyl-5alpha-cholest-7-en-3beta-ol + 3 NAD(P)H + 3 H+ + 3 O2  3beta-hydroxy-4beta-methyl-5alpha-cholest-7-ene-4alpha-carboxylate + 3 NAD(P)+ + 4 H2O (overall reaction)
(1a) 4,4-dimethyl-5alpha-cholest-7-en-3beta-ol + NAD(P)H + H+ + O2  4beta-hydroxymethyl-4alpha-methyl-5alpha-cholest-7-en-3beta-ol + NAD(P)+ + H2O
(1b) 4beta-hydroxymethyl-4alpha-methyl-5alpha-cholest-7-en-3beta-ol + NAD(P)H + H+ + O2  3beta-hydroxy-4beta-methyl-5alpha-cholest-7-ene-4alpha-carbaldehyde + NAD(P)+ + 2 H2O
(1c) 3beta-hydroxy-4beta-methyl-5alpha-cholest-7-ene-4alpha-carbaldehyde + NAD(P)H + H+ + O2  3beta-hydroxy-4beta-methyl-5alpha-cholest-7-ene-4alpha-carboxylate + NAD(P)+ + H2O

Methylsterol monooxygenase requires cytochrome b5.

References

External links 
 

EC 1.14.13